The Central New York Railroad  is a shortline railroad operating local freight service along ex-Southern Tier Line trackage (ex-Erie Railroad/Erie Lackawanna Railway mainline trackage) in the U.S. states of New York and Pennsylvania. The line begins at Port Jervis, following the Delaware River to Deposit and the Susquehanna River from Lanesboro, where it passes over the Starrucca Viaduct, to Binghamton. It is a subsidiary of the Delaware Otsego Corporation, which also owns the New York, Susquehanna and Western Railway, operator of through trains over the line (along with the Norfolk Southern Railway, lessor).

History
The CNYK began operations on December 12, 1972 between Cassville and Richfield Springs, New York, having purchased the trackage from the Erie Lackawanna Railway (EL). The  line being operated by the CNYK was opened by the Utica, Chenango and Susquehanna Valley Railway in November 1872 as a branch, and passed to the EL through consolidation. (EL successor Conrail sold the old Utica, Chenango and Susquehanna Valley main line through Cassville to the New York, Susquehanna and Western Railway in 1982.) The CNYK suspended service in early 1988 and was authorized to abandon the line in August 1995, at which time the corporation became inactive. Though the CNYK was inactive from 1988-2004, the CNYK was still in existence.

Delaware Otsego brought the CNYK back to life on December 31, 2004, when it leased the Binghamton-Port Jervis section of the Southern Tier Line from the Norfolk Southern Railway. The line is a former Erie Railroad property and this trackage was opened in December 1848, and passed through the Erie Lackawanna and Conrail to Norfolk Southern. When the CNYK leased the line, the Norfolk Southern retained overhead trackage rights to serve through freight traffic. Since the CNYK does not own any locomotives or other rolling stock, all trains over the CNYK are operated by Delaware Otsego's New York Susquehanna & Western Railway subsidiary, interchanging with the Norfolk Southern at Binghamton.

References

External links

Central New York Railroad

New York (state) railroads
Pennsylvania railroads
Railway companies established in 1972
Spin-offs of the Erie Lackawanna Railway
Spin-offs of the Norfolk Southern Railway
Central New York